The McCartney Years is a three-DVD set featuring music videos, live performances and other rare footage from Paul McCartney's solo career and Wings. The set spans the years 1970 to 2005. It was released by Warner Music in the UK on 12 November 2007, and by Rhino Entertainment in the United States the following day.

Content
The first two discs comprise promotional films, from "Maybe I'm Amazed" (1970) to "Fine Line" (2005). Additional features include a documentary about his recent album Chaos and Creation in the Backyard (Creating Chaos at Abbey Road), a film about the Band on the Run album and a feature-length audio commentary from McCartney himself.

The third disc includes seven songs from the 1976 Wings concert Rockshow, four songs from McCartney's 1991 appearance on MTV Unplugged, and eleven performances from his 2004 set at Glastonbury Festival. The live footage is also complemented by an optional commentary by McCartney.

Other features includes his appearance at Live Aid in 1985, the Super Bowl XXXIX Halftime Show and interviews with Melvyn Bragg and Michael Parkinson.

All videos have been digitally remastered, and the videos that were originally shot with an aspect ratio of 1.33 : 1 have been blown up to 1.78 : 1. This creates an odd effect for the videos, which now seem cinematic. The videos included as extras are presented in their original form. Also, some videos shot on interlaced PAL sources have been badly deinterlaced, such as the videos for "With a Little Luck", "Coming Up", "Waterfalls" and the Glastonbury 2004 set, resulting in jagged edges on the image. This does not affect the similarly shot "Goodnight Tonight" or "Baby's Request".

"Stranglehold", "Again, and Again and Again", "Spin it on", "The World Tonight" and  "Young Boy", were not included in this compilation.

Track listing

Disc 1
"Tug of War"
"Say Say Say"
"Silly Love Songs"
"Band on the Run"
"Maybe I'm Amazed"
"Heart of the Country"
"Mamunia"
"With a Little Luck"
"Goodnight Tonight"
"Waterfalls"
"My Love"
"C Moon"
"Baby's Request"
"Hi, Hi, Hi"
"Ebony and Ivory"
"Take It Away"
"Mull of Kintyre"
"Helen Wheels"
"I've Had Enough"
"Coming Up"
"Wonderful Christmastime"

Extras
"Eleanor's Dream" ("Eleanor Rigby")
"Band on the Run" (Version two)
Includes cover's photo shoot, as well as samples of "Nineteen Hundred and Eighty-Five", "Mrs. Vandebilt" and "Bluebird".
"Junior's Farm"
"London Town"
"Mull of Kintyre" (Elstree studios)
Also listed on YouTube as "The Misty Version", this is one of the song's many videos.

Disc 2
"Pipes of Peace"
"My Brave Face"
"Beautiful Night"
"Fine Line"
"No More Lonely Nights"
"This One"
"Little Willow"
"Pretty Little Head"
"Birthday" (live)
"Hope of Deliverance"
"Once Upon a Long Ago"
"All My Trials"
"Brown Eyed Handsome Man"
"Press"
"No Other Baby"
"Off the Ground"
"Biker Like an Icon"
"Spies Like Us"
"Put It There"
"Figure of Eight"
"C'Mon People"

Extras
Excerpts from Parkinson
"So Bad"
"Creating Chaos at Abbey Road"

Disc 3
Rockshow
"Venus and Mars"
"Rock Show"
"Jet"
"Maybe I'm Amazed"
"Lady Madonna"
"Listen to What the Man Said"
"Bluebird"

MTV Unplugged
"I Lost My Little Girl"
"Every Night"
"And I Love Her"
"That Would Be Something"

Glastonbury
"Jet"
"Flaming Pie"
"Let Me Roll It"
"Blackbird"
"Band on the Run"
"Back in the U.S.S.R."
"Live and Let Die"
"Hey Jude"
"Yesterday"
"Helter Skelter"
"Sgt. Pepper's Lonely Hearts Club Band (Reprise)" / "The End"

Extras
Live Aid performance
"Let It Be"
Super Bowl XXXIX Halftime Performance
"Drive My Car"
"Get Back"
"Live and Let Die"
"Hey Jude"

Hidden extras
Some videos on the first two discs have different angles, because one angle is an edited version of the original; the other the original. On disc one, "Goodnight Tonight" and "Baby's Request" have different angles. The edited angle on "Goodnight Tonight" has an old film effect, but include different shots from the original, unedited video. The edited angle on "Baby's Request" is full screen, but it is in sepia and resembles a video from a film projector. The second disc's different angle is McCartney's 2005 "Fine Line", where most of the video is just white with slight outlines of McCartney playing the instrument with bits of colour and a few seconds of live-action from the original music video appearing later on.

References

Paul McCartney video albums
2007 compilation albums
2007 live albums
2007 video albums
Live video albums
Music video compilation albums
Paul McCartney compilation albums
Paul McCartney live albums